= Tübingen Faculty of Economics =

Faculty at the University of Tübingen

Coordinates: 48.5292945°N 9.0627534°E

The Faculty of Economics (German: Fakultät für Wirtschaftswissenschaft) was one of fourteen faculties at the University of Tübingen. It was dissolved in 2010 in the course of an administrative reform, where the number of faculties was reduced from fourteen to seven. The faculty merged with the former Faculty of Social Sciences (German: Fakultät für Sozialwissenschaften).

The Faculty of Economics was founded in 1817 as the first Economics Faculty in Germany (then named Fakultät für Staatwissenschaften)

== Departments ==
The Faculty of Economics consisted only of the School of Business and Economics.
